Edoardo Weber (29 November 1889 – 17 May 1945) was an Italian engineer and businessman, famous for creating the Weber carburetor.

He was born in Torino to a Swiss father and a Jewish mother from Piemonte. After graduating in mechanical engineering from the Università degli Studi di Torino (1913), he moved to Bologna to work for Fiat. He was a tutor to Amédée Gordini. He drove a Fiat 501 to third place in the race on 13 June 1920 at Mugello.

His work to provide some remedy for high gasoline prices resulted in the first Weber carburetor, a "sidedraft, twin-choke ... bolted to a Weber designed overhead-valve/supercharger conversion for the 501 Fiat". In 1923, he established the  Fabbrica Italiana Carburatori Weber company, which, under his leadership, became a supplier to Fiat for mass-produced cars, as well as smaller-volume Alfa Romeo and Maserati racing cars.

Weber was a member of the Italian Fascist Party. In 1937, he received the Order of the Crown of Italy and, in 1943, the Order of Merit for Labour.

Bologna was liberated on April 21 of 1945 by the Italian Co-belligerent Army. Three weeks later, early in the morning on May 17, 1945, Weber was picked up by civilians from his factory office at Via del Timavo 18. He was never seen again, presumably executed by the Italian resistance movement.

Following his disappearance, Fiat eventually assumed control of the company in 1952.

In the Certosa di Bologna there is an empty tomb with his name written "Edoardo Weber". His widow Anna (1897–1985) wrote a biography in 1972.

References

Automotive engineers from Turin
Engineers from Bologna
University of Turin alumni
Italian automotive pioneers
Italian fascists
1889 births
1945 deaths